Eric Mitchell may refer to:

Eric Mitchell (boxer), professional boxer
Eric Mitchell (filmmaker), French-born writer, director and actor
Eric Mitchell (skier) (born 1992), Canadian ski jumper
Eric Mitchell (Eastenders), a fictional character in the soap opera